Rita chrysea, or the Mahanadi rita, is a species of bagrid catfish endemic to India where it inhabits the Mahanadi River system in Orissa and Madhya Pradesh. It is found in rivers and large streams. Spawning occurs during the monsoon months. It grows to a length of 19.5 cm and is commercially fished for human consumption.

References 
 

Bagridae
Catfish of Asia
Endemic fauna of India
Freshwater fish of India
Taxa named by Francis Day
Fish described in 1877